Amazon Obhijaan ( The Amazon expedition) is a 2017 Indian Bengali-language action-adventure film written and directed by Kamaleshwar Mukherjee and produced by Shrikant Mohta and Mahendra Soni under the banner of Shree Venkatesh Films. Starring Dev in the lead role of Shankar, it is the sequel to 2013 film Chander Pahar and the second installment of Chander Pahar film series. The film revolves around Shankar, an adventurer who, along with a lady and her father, travels the Amazon in search of the City of Gold, El Dorado.

Amazon Obhijaan happens to be the 100th film of the production house. The highest-grossing Bengali film ever, it was released theatrically on 22 December 2017. On 5 January 2018, the film was dubbed and released in five languages: Hindi, Tamil, Telugu, Odia and Assamese. It is also the first Bengali film to release theatrically in United Kingdom on 12 January 2018.

Plot
 
The sequel to the Chander Pahar film, the story begins with Shankar living in his hometown when he is approached by a young Italian woman named Anna Florian to accompany her and her father, Marco Florian, in finding mythical El Dorado, the city of gold in Amazon. Thus, the journey of Shankar begins.

Cast
 Dev as Shankar Ray Choudhuri
 Laboni Sarkar as Shankar's mother
 Tamal Ray Chowdhury as Shankar's father
 David James as Marco Florian
 Svetlana Gulakova as Anna Florian
 Eduardo Munniz as Ankoma
 Augusto Cesar as Doctor

Production
In earlier 2014, according to a Bengali magazine, director Kamaleshwar Mukherjee has already penned the script, taking the story forward from where it left and Dev has been quoted as saying that the next location, after the African safari, will be the dense forests of Amazon rainforest. The film has been titled Amazon Obhijan. Shooting has been started from May 2016.

Marketing
The first teaser and poster released on 21 September 2017.

The film's official poster has been launched at the Mohun Bagan Ground and made a record of the biggest film poster of history in India on 4 November 2017. It broke the previous record of Bahubali's poster and achieve Guinness book world record.

The trailer of the film was released on 1 December 2017 in Bengali, Assamese, Odia, Hindi, Tamil and Telugu language.

Graphic novel

Amazon Obhijaan is a 2017 graphic novel based on the film of the same name. It is written by the film's director Kamaleswar Mukherjee, and is available in English and Bengali. The graphic novel acts as a promotional activity for the film. It was released on 11 November 2017.

Soundtrack
Indraadip Dasgupta was signed to compose the songs of the film.

Reception
The Times of India rated the film 3/5, writing, "One must watch the film. Not only because of its grandeur but also to savour Kamaleswar’s imagination. The mythic city of El Dorado is pretty much the same as we had imagined in childhood. And finally, the film ends where it all began — with a reference to Reader’s Digest, the book that opened up the idea of Shankar’s first adventure, Chander Pahar, many years ago."

See also
 List of highest-grossing Bengali films

References

External links
 
 

2017 films
Bengali-language Indian films
2010s Bengali-language films
Indian action adventure films
Films directed by Kamaleshwar Mukherjee
Films set in Brazil
2010s action adventure films
Films based on Indian novels
Films set in the Amazon